The Fucile Mitragliatore Breda modello 30 was the standard light machine gun of the Royal Italian Army during World War II.

Design
The Breda 30 was rather unusual for a light machine gun. It was fed from a fixed magazine attached to the right side of the weapon and was loaded using brass or steel 20-round stripper clips. If the magazine or its hinge/latch were damaged the weapon became unusable. It also fired from a closed bolt along with using short recoil for its action. The rotating bolt was locked by six radially-arranged lugs (reminiscent of, e. g., AR-15, Mondragón rifles or a George Fosbery's shotgun).

The recoil operation was violent and often resulted in poor primary extraction. In the primary extraction phase of automatic firearms cycling, the initial small rearward movement of the hot expanded cartridge case away from the chamber's walls should be powerful but not too rapid, otherwise reliability problems may arise. Separated cases resulting in jamming of the Breda were usually the consequence of poor primary extraction, and this was often difficult to remedy in the field. The Breda 30 inherently lacked good primary extraction in its design, and thus utilized a small lubrication device that oiled each cartridge as it entered the chamber. The dust and sand of the deserts of North Africa caused significant premature wear and jamming.

As an automatic weapon's chamber and barrel heat up with prolonged automatic fire, the resulting excessive temperature can cause a chambered round to "cook off," or ignite without intent of the gunner.  As a result of firing from a closed bolt, the Breda 30 could not fully take advantage of the cooling properties of air circulation like an open bolt weapon would, thus making cooked off rounds a realistic hazard.  The disastrous results could lead to potential injuries to or even the death of the gunner. Some Bredas were eventually modified to accept the new 7.35 mm Carcano cartridge, which the Italian military was making an effort to adopt; however, this was short-lived as slowed production never allowed full adoption of the new cartridge.

Service history
In regular army units, one Breda 30 was issued to each squad (standard issue was 24 to 27 per battalion), although this was later changed to two weapons per squad. An Italian infantry company therefore had about six light machine guns in the early years of World War II (two per platoon), but this number eventually increased to twelve for the majority of the war (four per platoon).

An infantry platoon was divided into two large sections, each of twenty men, which were further split into rifle and light machine gun squads.  The section was commanded by a sergeant, who also controlled the LMG squad. The latter was made up of two Breda 30s, each manned by a corporal gunner, an assistant gunner and two ammunition bearers.  The balance of the section was the rifle squad of eleven men. Due to the importance of its extra firepower, the Breda 30 was most often given to the squad's most reliable soldier (unlike other armies of the time, it was not rare to see an NCO carrying the squad's automatic weapon). The manual indicates that the two squads were to operate as distinct elements, with the two LMGs supporting the rifle squad in its objective.  At the time, most other armies embedded a light machine gun with each section or squad, usually half the size of the Italian section, which by comparison seems an unwieldy organisation. As individual weapons, pistols were issued to each corporal gunner, a carbine for the sergeant-major, and rifles for all others.

The Breda 30 was first used in the Second Italo-Ethiopian War.

The Wehrmacht adopted the Breda 30 in small numbers after the occupation of Northern and Central Italy following the Italian armistice of 1943 with the Allies, as the MG 099(i); it filled a similar role as the German MG 34, a light machine gun, predominantly utilized in Italian campaign battlefields.

Combat performance

The Breda 30 was widely viewed as a poorly designed weapon. It had a low rate of fire, low magazine capacity, used sometimes unreliable  ammunition and was highly prone to stoppages. The vital oiling system was very susceptible to allowing dust and debris to get into the action system, making the weapon unreliable in combat conditions. Though the magazine system was designed with the rationale that the feed lips on a detachable magazine are prone to damage, the Breda's sole magazine could also become disabled if the hinges or latches were damaged, and the slit on the top for viewing the ammunition count provided another way for debris to enter and jam the magazine.

The Breda's rear and fore sight were both on the gun body, so only one barrel could be zeroed and any spare barrels would, when installed, invariably lead to decreased accuracy without re-zeroing the sights. The magazine was loaded using 20-round stripper clips, which were known to be fragile, especially in combat conditions. In North Africa, the weapon's full-auto mode was nearly unusable: desert sand and dust caused the weapon to jam continuously, with the oil used in the cartridge lubrication only exaggerating this problem. Because of its highly frequent jamming and stoppages, the Breda, despite being a machine gun, was more comparable to a semi-automatic rifle in terms of fire output. In the Balkans, Eastern Front and other theatres of war, the weapon achieved slightly better results. 

Low magazine capacity, frequent jamming and the complicated barrel change made firing and reloading a slow and laborious process, resulting in the Breda 30 being a weapon only capable of laying down a diminutive amount of firepower and making it a very modest contributor to a firefight. When considering all of the gun's deficiencies, taken during combat when it was at its worst, the practical rate of fire of the Breda 30 could even have been comparable to a semi-automatic weapon's practical rate of fire, as the standard American rifle was (the M1 Garand and M1 Carbine) and the later German Gewehr 43.

Although considerably flawed when compared to its contemporaries, the Breda 30 was still considered the deadliest weapon of the standard Italian infantryman's arsenal, since heavy machine guns were seen in relatively small numbers and submachine guns such as Beretta Model 38 were very rare. The Breda 30 along with the Carcano rifle made up the backbone of the Italian infantry armament during the Second World War. Field reports on the weapon were of mixed nature: the Breda's very low rate of fire often resulted in a turning of the tide during a firefight against Italian soldiers; however, the Breda 30, in most occasions, was the fastest and most helpful weapon available.  The Italian Army attempted to counter the Breda's defects by stressing the importance of the loader's role: every soldier was trained to be a Breda 30 loader and taught how to rapidly feed one ammunition strip after another (this was not always possible, as with Breda 30s mounted on motorcycles). Careful polishing was also carried out frequently with extra attention being paid to the Breda's lubrication system and ammunition availability.

Users
 
 
 
 
 
 
  Yugoslavia

References

External links
 Comando Supremo
 SPWAW article

Light machine guns
World War II infantry weapons of Italy
World War II machine guns
Machine guns of Italy
Breda weapons